Kambakota or Kamakota is a village located in the Central African Republic prefecture of Ouham.

History 
In 1985 UNICEF built three wells in Kambota, two of which had broken down as of 2008. In March 2008 around 1,400 displaced people arrived there from other villages.

On 1 December 2016 it was reported that Kambakota was under control of MPC. As of October 2018 Kambakota was under control of Anti-balaka. In October 2020 heavy clashes erupted between Anti-balaka factions in Kambakota. On 26 February 2021 Kambakota was captured by government forces supported by Rwandian military. On 4 January 2022 armed forces clashes with CPC rebels killing four of them.

References 

Populated places in Ouham-Fafa